Manuela Müller  (born 7 October 1980) is a Swiss freestyle skier. She was born in Thalwil. She competed at the 2002 Winter Olympics in Salt Lake City. She competed at the 2006 Winter Olympics in Turin, where she placed seventh in women's aerials.

References

External links 
 

1980 births
People from Thalwil
Living people
Swiss female freestyle skiers
Olympic freestyle skiers of Switzerland
Freestyle skiers at the 2002 Winter Olympics
Freestyle skiers at the 2006 Winter Olympics
Sportspeople from the canton of Zürich
21st-century Swiss women